Cha Cha Cha Township or simply known as Cha Cha Cha is a rural shopping centre in Shurugwi Rural Areas, 24 km South East of Shurugwi along the Beit Bridge road and  from Gweru. The tarred road from 12 km before Shurugwi was constructed by a Chinese company called China-Gansui and is considered one of the best located rural shopping centres in Zimbabwe, therefore it can not be considered a remote area. It is relatively below standards with potholes and experienced sinking in some stages, and was heavily affected by the floods during the summer of 2000.

The shopping centre, township as it is known in Zimbabwe, was at one stage bigger than some of the small towns such as Shurugwi and Zvishavane but things started deteriorating due to the economic meltdown as experienced in the country.

History
Cha Cha Cha was derived from the name of the hotel at the township which is called Happy Cha Cha Cha Hotel which was known for all holding concert of Cha Cha Cha dancers during its early days. Cha Cha Cha was an administration centre for the Boers mainly of them farmers during its early days, but was later turned into a camp for the soldiers during the days of Ian Smith. The idea was to develop it into one of the biggest towns, if not cities since there was a hospital and an 'airport' nearby.

The original name was Donga Township due to the vast number of dongas through erosion. In 1980, it was renamed Herbert Chitepo Business Centre after the late liberation struggle hero but that name failed to be recognised.

Main Routes
It is at a confluence where major road routes meet. All traffic flows from Shurugwi on one road only to divert into different roads at Cha Cha Cha. The main road continues to Beit Bridge where traffic to Mashava and Masvingo will divert to the east while Zvishavane and Bulawayo will divert west wards after 49 km. The Beit Bridge road will continue straight on.

Other Rural Links
Roads to Pakame Mission will take the south western direction from Cha Cha Cha while the Tongogara route takes the Eastern direction. Tongogara High School is 17 km to the east while Pakame Mission is 20 km to the South-West. Hanke Mission is 20 km to the North. Vungwi Primary School is 2 km along the Tongogara road. Zvamabande Hospital is 2 km to South -East, 1 km along the main Beit Bridge road and 1 km off the highway to the east.

Landing Ground
There is a landing ground for small to medium aeroplanes. Mugabe makes use of it when he is visiting the area which happens once in every 25 years, as January 2006 he had only visited the areas twice making him a generally unknown figure among the rural people who vote him into power. Due to the poor state of the dusty/dirty road, motorists have opened up several tracks through the landing area which is an even more clear sign of economic hardship.

Main Schools
Vungwi Primary School, Wida Primary School, Mhangami Primary School, Mupangai Secondary School, and Rusununguko Secondary School are all within 5 km from Cha Cha Cha Township.

Main Shops
The major business at Cha Cha Cha is retail. Most of the business men are general dealers, and there are 2 bakers operating at the township and about 4 millers. Ganyani was traditionally the biggest shop due to their business diversity. There are also a number of bottle stores and 2 beer halls making it the 'only' best place to relax.

Growth Point Statures
After the demise of Tongogara Township to be the growth point in Shurugwi mainly due to its location, the status was moved to Cha Cha Cha. This has seen a Post Office being opened at the centre and a number of super market chains has since tried their luck there. During the early years of the two townships, there have been competition to grow but Cha Cha Cha easily won it because of its location. There is only one bus route passing through Tongogara.

Residential Areas
After 1990 residential stands were allocated in order to develop a residential suburb-like area which was to kick start the development Cha Cha Cha Township towards a town status but the economic conditions has hampered such aspirations. Modern houses are being constructed however and most companies have their regional headquarters at Cha Cha Cha due to roughly available facilities and ease of access.

Surrounding Villages
Marira, Mbengo, Ndanga, Ndawana, Mhangami;,kuziyamisa and others all are the sphere of influence of Cha Cha Cha Township.

References

Populated places in Midlands Province